Saddam Omar al-Jamal is a Syrian Islamic militant and Islamic State of Iraq and the Levant leader. He is known for taking part in a 2014 massacre of the Al-Shaitat and being involved in the death of Jordanian pilot Muath Al-Kasasbeh.

History

Free Syrian Army

He was originally leader of the Allahu Akbar Brigade, a Free Syrian Army faction operating in Deir Ezzor, which had more than 800 fighters. According to Al-Jazeera, "Jamal was not only the leader of a battalion but also a top FSA commander for the whole of Syria's eastern region." He was the leader of the Supreme Military Council (Syria)'s Eastern Front. The Allahu Akbar brigade was part of the Ahfad al-Rasul Brigade.

Islamic State

On 16 December 2013, he appeared in a video entitled 'Revealing the biggest conspiracy targeting the Islamic State in Iraq and the Levant' announcing he had joined the Islamic State in Iraq and the Levant.

The extent to which he had a choice in joining the ISIL has been disputed, with his defection sometimes cast as a 'surrender' to ISIL after two of his brothers were kidnapped, his brother's house was bombed and several of his fighters died. During this time, Jamal narrowly escaped an assassination attempt after a man blew himself up at the headquarters. Jamal had set up at a branch of the state bank.

From then on through 2014, he was the ISIL emir for Abu Kamal, Syria, his home town.

In September 2015 it was reported he had been appointed as a deputy to Abu Firas al-Iraqi, the ISIL governor of their Euphrates province straddling the Iraq-Syria border.

Saddam al-Jamal was captured on 9 May 2018 along with four other commanders in the Syria-Iraq border by Iraqi forces.

References

Islamic State of Iraq and the Levant in Syria
People of the Syrian civil war
Islamic State of Iraq and the Levant members from Syria
Defectors to the Free Syrian Army
1987 births
Syrian Salafis
Living people
People from Deir ez-Zor Governorate